Bayano River is a river of Panama in the Panamá Province.  It is an alternative name for the upper part of the Chepo River.

It is named after Bayano, the leader of a slave revolt and ruler of a kingdom of former slaves in 16th century Panama.

It was dammed in the 1970s, creating Lago Bayano.  This dam provides much of the electrical power for Panama City.

External links
 Fishing on the Bayano River
 Bayano River snook fishing
 Bayano River tarpon fishing

Rivers of Panama
Gulf of Panama
Panamá Province
Drainage basins of the Pacific Ocean